Shang'ombo is a constituency of the National Assembly of Zambia. It was created in 2016, when Sinjembela was split into two constituencies (Sioma and Shang'ombo). It covers Shangombo District in Western Province, including the town of Shangombo.

List of MPs

References 

Constituencies of the National Assembly of Zambia
2016 establishments in Zambia
Constituencies established in 2016